The End is a 2016 French mystery drama film written and directed by Guillaume Nicloux and starring Gérard Depardieu. The film premiered in the Forum section at the 66th Berlin International Film Festival. It was released on VOD on 8 April 2016.

Cast 
 Gérard Depardieu as The man
 Audrey Bonnet as The woman
 Swann Arlaud as The young man
 Xavier Beauvois as Hiker
 Didier Abot as Guy

Accolades

References

External links 
 

2016 films
2010s mystery drama films
2010s French-language films
French mystery drama films
Gaumont Film Company films
Films set in forests
Films directed by Guillaume Nicloux
2016 drama films
2010s French films